The 2012–13 Toros Mexico season was the fourth season of the Toros Mexico professional indoor soccer club but first under the "Toros Mexico" name. The Toros, a Southwestern Division team in the Professional Arena Soccer League, played their home games at UniSantos Park in Tijuana, Mexico. The team was led by owner and head coach Joe Pollard.

Season summary
The team had mixed results in the regular season, compiling a 7–9 record, but placed second in the PASL's Southwest Division. The Toros fared better at home than on the road, dropping six of their eight away matches. The team advanced to the postseason and earned the right to play for the Ron Newman Cup in the PASL National Championship. The Toros lost two straight games to the Las Vegas Legends in the Divisional Finals, ending their playoff run.

The Toros did not participate in the 2012–13 United States Open Cup for Arena Soccer.

History
The Toros played the 2009-10, 2010–11, and 2011–12 seasons as "Revolución Tijuana". In September 2012, Ramon Quezada and Eduardo Vele sold the team to head coach Joe Pollard but retained the rights to the old name and logo.

The team's road loss to the San Diego Sockers on November 23, 2012, gave the Sockers the new United States record for consecutive wins by a professional soccer team.

Off-field moves
As part of the Toros Mexico commitment to social work, the team visited the Casa Hogar La Esperanza orphanage on December 20, 2012, to entertain the children, bring them gifts, and play exhibition soccer with the residents.

Schedule

Regular season

Postseason

References

External links 

Toros Mexico official website

Toros Mexico
Toros Mexico
Sports in Tijuana
Mexican football clubs 2012–13 season
21st century in Tijuana